Sugarloaf Rock is a steep, rocky unpopulated islet located close to the south-western coast of Tasmania, Australia. Sugarloaf Rock is part of the Southwest National Park and the Tasmanian Wilderness World Heritage Site.

Fauna
The island is part of the Port Davey Islands Important Bird Area, so identified by BirdLife International because of its importance for breeding seabirds. Recorded breeding seabird and wader species are the short-tailed shearwater (15,000 pairs), fairy prion (2000 pairs), silver gull and sooty oystercatcher.  It is a haul-out site for Australian fur seals.

See also

 List of islands of Tasmania

References

Islands of Tasmania
South West Tasmania
Protected areas of Tasmania
Important Bird Areas of Tasmania